Brachurapteryx breviaria is a species of moth from the genus Brachurapteryx.

References

Ennominae
Moths described in 1825